Alphonse Feyder (12 June 1916 – 23 July 1985) was a Luxembourgian footballer. He played in six matches for the Luxembourg national football team from 1938 to 1947. He was also part of Luxembourg's squad for the football tournament at the 1936 Summer Olympics, but he did not play in any matches.

References

External links
 

1916 births
1985 deaths
Luxembourgian footballers
Luxembourg international footballers
Place of birth missing
Association football defenders
FC Progrès Niederkorn players